The (50) is a denomination of the Indian rupee. The present 50 banknote in circulation is a part of the Mahatma Gandhi New Series of  banknotes. However, 50 banknotes of the previous series (Mahatma Gandhi Series) will continue to be legal tender.

The 50 banknote denomination was first introduced by the Reserve Bank of India (RBI) in 1975 as a part of the Lion Capital Series, which had the Ashoka pillar on the banknote. It was replaced by a watermark of Mahatma Gandhi in the Mahatma Gandhi Series, in 1996.

Mahatma Gandhi New Series 

On 10 November 2016, the Reserve Bank of India announced, a new redesigned 50 banknote was to be available as a part of the Mahatma Gandhi New Series. The note was officially announced on 18 August 2017 and now on circulation. On 18 August 2017, the Reserve Bank of India introduced a new 50 banknote in the Mahatma Gandhi (New) Series. However, 50 banknotes of the previous series will continue to be legal tender.

Design 
The new version of the note has a depiction of Hampi with Chariot on the reverse, depicting the country's cultural heritage. The base colour of the note is Fluorescent blue. The note has other designs, geometric patterns aligning with the overall colour scheme, both at the obverse and reverse. The dimensions of the banknote are measured at 135 mm × 66 mm.

History

Lion capital series 

The 50 banknote in the Lion capital series was the highest denomination.

Design 
The obverse design included the Lion Capital. The reverse design included an image of the Sansad Bhawan.

Mahatma Gandhi Series

Design 
As of 2012, the new  sign has been incorporated in revised versions of the 50 note. In January 2014 RBI announced that it would be withdrawing from circulation all banknotes printed prior to 2005 by 31 March 2014. The deadline was later extended to 1 January 2015, then to 30 June 2016.

Security features 

The security features of the 50 banknote includes:

A windowed security thread that reads 'भारत' (Bharat in the Devanagari script) and 'RBI' alternately.
Latent image of the value of the banknote on the vertical band next to the right hand side of Mahatma Gandhi's portrait.
Watermark of Gandhi that is a mirror image of the main portrait.
The number panel of the banknote is printed in embedded fluorescent fibers and optically variable ink.
Since 2005 additional security features like machine-readable security thread, electrotype watermark, and year of print appears on the bank note.

Languages 

Like the other Indian rupee banknotes, the 50 banknote has its amount written in 17 languages. On the obverse, the denomination is written in English and Hindi. On the reverse is a language panel which displays the denomination of the note in 15 of the 22 official languages of India. The languages are displayed in alphabetical order. Languages included on the panel are Assamese, Bengali, Gujarati, Kannada, Kashmiri, Konkani, Malayalam, Marathi, Nepali, Odia, Punjabi, Sanskrit, Tamil, Telugu and Urdu.

References 

Banknotes of India
Rupee
Fifty-base-unit banknotes